Alta banka (full name: Alta banka a.d. Beograd), formerly known as JUBMES banka, is a Serbian bank, providing commercial and investment banking. Its headquarters is in Belgrade, Serbia.

History

The bank was established in 1979.

In October 2018, the Government of Serbia announced that it plans to sell its stake by the end of the year. In December 2018, the Government of Serbia put its 28.51% stake in ownership structure on sale. As of 22 March 2019, JUBMES banka has a market capitalization of 25.67 million euros.

On 27 March 2020, the bank changed its name to Alta banka, following the change in ownership structure.

See also
 List of banks in Serbia

References

External links
 

1979 establishments in Serbia
Banks established in 1979
Banks of Serbia
Companies based in Belgrade
Government-owned companies of Serbia
Serbian brands